Walk the Line is a 2005 American biographical drama film directed by James Mangold.

Walk the Line may also refer to:

 Walk the Line (Mary Wilson album), a 1992 album released by former Supremes member  on the independent CEO Records label
 Walk the Line (soundtrack), a Grammy Award-winning soundtrack from the film
 "Walk the Line", a song by Iggy Azalea from the 2014 album The New Classic
 Walk the Line (TV series), a 2021 UK television series on ITV

See also
 I Walk the Line (disambiguation)
 We Walk the Line: A Celebration of the Music of Johnny Cash , a 2012 tribute album to Johnny Cash